Mikhail Dmitriyevich Skobelev (29 September 1843 – 7 July 1882), a Russian general, became famous for his conquest of Central Asia and for his heroism during the  Russo-Turkish War of 1877–1878. Dressed in a white uniform and mounted on a white horse, and always in the thickest of the fray, he was known and adored by his soldiers as the "White General" (and by the Turks as the "White Pasha"). During a campaign in Khiva, his  Turkmen opponents called him goz ganly or "Bloody Eyes".

British Field Marshal Bernard Montgomery assessed Skobelev as the world's "ablest single commander" between 1870 and 1914 and wrote of his "skilful and inspiring" leadership.
Francis Vinton Greene also rated Skobelev highly.

Early life and Conquest of Khiva
Skobelev was born in Saint Petersburg on 29 September 1843. His mother was Russian philanthropist Olga Skobeleva, and his father was Russian general Dmitry Ivanovich Skobelev. After graduating from the General Staff Academy as a staff officer, he was sent to Turkestan in 1868 and, with the exception of an interval of two years, during which he was on the staff of the grand duke Michael in the Caucasus, remained in Central Asia until 1877.

During the Khivan campaign of 1873 he commanded the advanced guard of General Lomakin's column from Kinderly Bay, in the Caspian Sea, to join General Verevkin, from Orenburg, in the expedition to the Khanate of Khiva, and, after great suffering on the desert march, took a prominent part in the capture of the Khivan capital. Later, dressed as a Turkoman, he intrepidly explored in a hostile country the route from Khiva to Igdy on the old riverbed of the Oxus.

In 1875, he was given an important command in the expedition against the Khanate of Kokand under General Konstantin Petrovich von Kaufmann, showing great capacity in the action of Makram, where he outmanoeuvered a greatly superior force and captured 58 guns, and in a brilliant night attack during the retreat from Andijan, when he routed a large force with a handful of cavalry.

Later life, the Battle of Pleven, Geok Tepe and Death

He was promoted to major-general, decorated with the Order of St George, and appointed the first governor of the Ferghana Oblast. In the Turkish War of 1877 he seized the bridge over the Siret at Barboşi (nowadays a neighborhood of Galaţi, where the Siret flows into the Danube) in April; in June they crossed the Danube with the 8th corps. Skobelev commanded the Caucasian Cossack Brigade in the attack of the Green Hills at the second battle of Pleven. An infantry division under Skobelev's command assailed the Grivitsa redoubt to the north. Schakofsky managed to take two redoubts, but by the end of the day the Ottoman forces succeeded in repulsing all the attacks and retaking lost ground. Russian losses amounted to 7,300, and the Ottomans' to 2,000.

At the captured Lovetch on 3 September, the general distinguished himself again in desperate fighting on the Green Hills during the third battle of Pleven in which Skobelev took two southern redoubts. The Romanian 4th division led by General George Manu took the Grivitsa redoubt after four bloody assaults, personally assisted by Prince Carol. The next day the Turks retook the southern redoubts, but could not dislodge the Romanians, who repelled three counterattacks. From the beginning of September, Russian losses had amounted to roughly 20,000, while the Ottomans lost 5,000.

Promoted to be a lieutenant-general, and given the command of the 16th Division, he took part in the investment of Pleven and also in the fight of 9 December, when Osman Pasha surrendered, with his army. In January 1878 he crossed the Balkans in a severe snowstorm defeating the Turks at Sheynovo, near Shipka capturing 36,000 men and 90 guns.

Skobelev returned to Turkestan after the war, and in 1880 and 1881 further distinguished himself by retrieving the disasters inflicted by the Tekke Turkomans: following the Siege of Geoktepe, it was stormed, the general captured the fort. Around 8,000 Turkmen soldiers and civilians, including women and children were slaughtered in a bloodbath in their flight, along with an additional 6,500 who died inside the fortress. The Russians massacre included all Turkmen males in the fortress who had not escaped, but they spared some 5,000 women and children and freed 600 Persian slaves. The defeat at Geok Tepe and the following slaughter broke the Turkmen resistance and decided the fate of Transcaspia, which was annexed to the Russian Empire. The great slaughter proved too much to stomach reducing the Akhal-Tekke country to submission. Skobelev was removed from his command because of the massacre. He was advancing on Ashkhabad and Kalat i-Nadiri when he was disavowed and recalled to Moscow. He was given the command at Minsk. The official reason for his transfer to Europe was to appease European public opinion over the slaughter at Geok Tepe. Some have suggested that he was suffering from delusions of grandeur and showing signs of political ambition.

In the last years of his life, Skobelev engaged actively in politics, supporting the ideas of Russian nationalism and militant Pan-Slavism. He has also been credited as one of the earliest promoters of the concept "Russia for Russians". At the beginning of 1882, he made speeches in Paris and in Moscow, predicting a desperate strife between Slavs and Germans. He was at once recalled to St Petersburg. He was staying at the Hôtel Dusseaux in Moscow and on his way to his estate in the country when he died suddenly of a heart attack on 7 July 1882. In Russia he was a very popular man at the time of his death, and not surprisingly, his death aroused suspicion among many. After all, he was a relatively young (38) and vigorous man. Skobelev's early death deprived Russia of a great military leader. This became especially evident during the Russo-Japanese War of 1904–05. The Russian generals commanding in that war were men of Skobelev's generation, but none of them had his military genius or charisma.

Skobelev In Memoriam 
After Skobelev's death, in Moscow a monument was raised in his honour on a major square on Tverskaya Street (across from the city hall, where today stands the statue of Yuri Dolgorukiy, the founder of Moscow), which was given his name, and the town of Fergana in Uzbekistan was renamed Skobelev.

Today, his name still lives, even beyond the Russian Federation: shortly after the end of the Turkish War of 1877, the Bulgarians constructed a park in Pleven, Skobelev Park, on one of the hills where the major battles for the city took place.  The park is also a location of the Panorama Pleven's Epopee 1877 memorial, where in one of the scenes of the gigantic 360 degree panoramic painting the White General is displayed charging with his horse and bare sword, leading the infantry Russian attack on the Turkish positions. A central boulevard in Sofia, the capital city of Bulgaria, also bears Mikhail Dmitriyevich Skobelev's name.

Shortly after the entrance of the park, the bust of the famous general can be seen, watching over the city.  The park contains memorials with the names of the Russian and Romanian soldiers that died for the liberation of Pleven, and is decorated with non-functional arms donated by Russia: cannons, cannonballs, gatling guns, rifles, and bayonets.

Honours and awards

Russian
 Order of St. Stanislaus, 1st class with swords
 Order of St. Anna. 1st and 4th classes
 Order of St. George, 2nd, 3rd and 4th classes
 Order of St. Vladimir, 3rd class with swords
 Gold Sword for Bravery
 Gold Sword for Bravery with diamonds
 Gold Sword for Bravery with diamonds for the transition of the Balkans

Foreign
 Order of the Red Eagle, 1st and 2nd class with swords (Prussia)
 Pour le Mérite (Prussia)
 Grand Cross of the Order of the Cross of Takovo (Serbia)
 Order of the Cross of Takovo with swords (Serbia)
 Serbian Gold Medal for bravery;
 Montenegrin Medal
 Romanian Medal for military valour

Notes

References
 

1843 births
1882 deaths
Military personnel from Saint Petersburg
People from Saint Petersburg Governorate
Imperial Russian Army generals
Russian military personnel of the Russo-Turkish War (1877–1878)
Russian people of the January Uprising
Recipients of the Order of Saint Stanislaus (Russian), 1st class
Recipients of the Order of St. Vladimir, 3rd class
Recipients of the Order of St. George of the Second Degree
Recipients of the Order of St. George of the Third Degree
Recipients of the Order of St. Anna, 1st class
Recipients of the Medal for Bravery (Serbia)
Recipients of the Gold Sword for Bravery
Recipients of the Pour le Mérite (military class)
Recipients of the Order of the Cross of Takovo
Russian nationalists
Great Game